Kathleen Fuller (born September 11, 1967) is an American writer, specializing in Christian and Amish romantic fiction. She was born in New Orleans, Louisiana, grew up in Little Rock, Arkansas and currently resides in Geneva, Ohio with her husband, James Fuller, and three children.

Biography
As a stay-at-home mother of three Kathleen Fuller became enamored with Christian fiction. She started writing in 2000, and a year after published her first short story. By 2003, she published her first novella, "Encore, Encore" and by 2004, Kathleen would release her first full-length novel, Santa Fe Sunrise under Avalon. Since then Kathleen has authored several short stories, novellas, novels, and some freelance non-fiction works.

Kathleen's break out year came when Thomas Nelson Publishers offered her several opportunities to write and participate in a series of Amish romance novels. In 2009, Kathleen's novel, A Man of His Word, was released and became a CBA and ECPA bestseller. Kathleen followed that with the successful release of the anthology An Amish Christmas featuring her novella "A Miracle for Miriam." The anthology would go on to become a CBD, CBA, and ECPA Bestseller.

Novels
Never Broken (Everlasting Faith Book 1), 2015, Mountain Brook Ink
A Reluctant Bride (Amish of Birch Creek), 2015, Thomas Nelson
A Faith of Her Own (Middlefield Amish), 2015, Thomas Nelson
Letters to Katie (A Middlefield Family Novel), 2013, Thomas Nelson
Faithful to Laura (A Middlefield Family Novel), 2012, Thomas Nelson
Hide and Secret (Mysteries of Middlefield #3), 2011, Tommy Nelson
Treasuring Emma (A Middlefield Family Novel), 2011, Thomas Nelson 
What the Heart Sees: A Collection of Amish Romances, 2011, Thomas Nelson
The Secrets Beneath (Mysteries of Middlefield #2), 2010, Thomas Nelson
A Hand to Hold (Hearts of Middlefield #3), 2010, Thomas Nelson 
A Summer Secret (Mysteries of Middlefield #1), 2010, Thomas Nelson 
An Honest Love (Hearts of Middlefield #2), 2010, Thomas Nelson
A Man of His Word (Hearts of Middlefield #1), 2009, Thomas Nelson
A Daring Escape, 2009, Avalon Books
A Clever Disguise, 2008, Avalon Books
A Brilliant Deception, 2008, Avalon Books
Never Broken, 2006, Premium Press America
San Antonio Sunset, 2006, Avalon Books
San Francisco Serenade, 2006, Avalon Books
Special Assignment, 2005, Avalon Books
Santa Fe Sunrise, 2004, Avalon Books

Novellas
A Heart Full of Love in An Amish Cradle: An Amish Cradle Novella, 2015, Thomas Nelson 
Flowers for Rachael in An Amish Garden: An Amish Garden Novella, 2014, Thomas Nelson 
The Calling in A Pioneer Christmas, 2013, Barbour Books
What the Heart Sees in An Amish Love, 2010, Thomas Nelson 
A Miracle for Miriam in An Amish Christmas: December in Lancaster County, 2009, Thomas Nelson
A Place of His Own in An Amish Gathering, 2009, Thomas Nelson
Christmas Legacy in A Christmas Homecoming, 2003, Tyndale
Encore, Encore in Chance Encounters of the Heart, 2003, Tyndale

References

External links
Official website
Interview with Kathleen Fuller
Fiction Finder Interview with Kathleen Fuller
Interview with author Kathleen Fuller
Christian Books.com Interview with Kathleen Fuller
Featured Author Interview with Kathleen Fuller
Ask the Author: Kathleen Fuller
Kathleen Fuller Romantic Real Life Interview
Interview and Giveaway with Kathy Fuller
Interview the Author Kathleen Fuller
Interview with Kathleen Fuller Part 2 Jan 16
Novel Pastimes Interview with Kathleen Fuller Part 2

1967 births
American women novelists
Christian novelists
Living people
21st-century American novelists
People from Geneva, Ohio
21st-century American women writers
Writers from New Orleans
Novelists from Ohio
Writers from Little Rock, Arkansas
American women short story writers
21st-century American short story writers
Novelists from Louisiana